José Martín Castillo (born 13 January 1977) is a Mexican former professional boxer. He represented his native country of Mexico at the 1996 Summer Olympics, and is a former World Boxing Association (WBA) Super Flyweight champion.

Amateur career 
Castillo had an amateur record of 160-20 (90 KOs). He represented Mexico as a Flyweight at the 1996 Atlanta Olympic Games. He lost in the opening round to Zoltan Lunka of Germany 13-7 on points. It is one of the few foreign fighters who have won a medal (bronze) in the prestigious international boxing tournament Giraldo Cordoba Cardin, which every year is celebrated in Cuba by invitation, Martin Castillo won the bronze in 1996 in Camaguey, losing in semifinals with Cuban Hector Barrientos.

Professional career 
Castillo, nicknamed "Gallo" (Rooster), first fought for a world title on March 30, 2002, against Felix Machado.  Castillo suffered a cut due to a headbutt, and the fight was stopped in the 6th round.  By rule when a headbutt is ruled to be unintentional, the fight went to the scorecards.  All three judges ruled against Castillo, although many thought he was winning the fight.

Championship Reign 
After winning the WBA interim title, Castillo fought the full WBA champion, Alexander Muñoz, on December 3, 2004 in Laredo, Texas. At the time, Muñoz was a widely respected and feared power puncher, with an undefeated record in 25 fights, with 24 wins by way of knock-out.  Castillo frustrated Muñoz with slick boxing skills and expert use of angles. Castillo dropped Muñoz twice on the way to a fairly easy unanimous decision victory.

Castillo defended his title in a unanimous decision victory over former WBA flyweight champion Eric Morel on March 19, 2005 in Las Vegas, Nevada.  Castillo received some exposure in this fight, as it was the first televised bout on the Pay-Per-View (PPV) fight card featuring the first match between boxing superstars Érik Morales and Manny Pacquiao.  However, Castillo's victory was a workman-like effort, largely because Morel employed a very defensive style. Castillo followed this victory with another unanimous decision defense of his belt over Hideyasu Ishihara on June 26, 2005 in a fight held in Nagoya, Japan.

The rematch between Erik Morales and Manny Pacquiao on January 21, 2006 in Las Vegas, Nevada provided another opportunity to feature Castillo on the PPV undercard, this time as the chief supporting bout to the main event.  Castillo was rematched with Muñoz, who had won three fights since losing his belt.  This time Muñoz came much better prepared, applying pressure from the opening bell and dropping Castillo in the first round.  Castillo also suffered bad cuts over both eyes as the fight progressed. The aggressiveness of Muñoz and his heavy punches won him the early rounds. However, Castillo rallied in the later rounds, using better technique and counter-punches, but also exhibiting aggressiveness.  The last three rounds featured furious exchanges between the fighters, with Muñoz growing increasingly tired, but still launching dangerous power punches.

Castillo won a split decision victory, but perhaps more importantly, he demonstrated a crowd-pleasing style to a wide audience. Although hard-core boxing fans appreciate his use of boxing skills, "blood and guts" battles lead to larger purses.

Title Loss to Nashiro 
On July 22, 2006, Castillo lost his title to Nobuo Nashiro in Japan.  The fight was stopped in the 10th round because Castillo was bleeding heavily from cuts.  Given that the cuts were caused by punches, Nashiro won the fight by technical knock-out.  Nashiro, a young boxer with only 7 professional fights, surprised Castillo with an effective aggressive style in the early rounds.  Castillo was winning later rounds - had the fight gone to the scorecards after the 9th round, it would have been a draw, as one judge had Nashiro winning, one had Castillo winning, and one had it even.

After the Nashiro fight, Castillo underwent surgery to fix the scar tissue over his eyes. As Castillo had always been susceptible to cuts, the surgeons also shaved down Castillo's prominent brow ridges, a procedure sometimes performed on boxers who cut a lot.  Therefore, he was out of action for almost a year.

Castillo had two unremarkable wins after losing his title, and as of September 2007, is continuing his comeback.

Castillo is trained by Manuel Robles, managed by Frank Espinoza, and promoted by Bob Arum's Top Rank.

Professional record

|- style="margin:0.5em auto; font-size:95%;"
|align="center" colspan=8|35 Wins (18 knockouts), 4 Losses, 0 Draw
|- style="margin:0.5em auto; font-size:95%;"
|align=center style="border-style: none none solid solid; background: #e3e3e3"|Res.
|align=center style="border-style: none none solid solid; background: #e3e3e3"|Record
|align=center style="border-style: none none solid solid; background: #e3e3e3"|Opponent
|align=center style="border-style: none none solid solid; background: #e3e3e3"|Type
|align=center style="border-style: none none solid solid; background: #e3e3e3"|Rd., Time
|align=center style="border-style: none none solid solid; background: #e3e3e3"|Date
|align=center style="border-style: none none solid solid; background: #e3e3e3"|Location
|align=center style="border-style: none none solid solid; background: #e3e3e3"|Notes
|-align=center
|Loss || 35-4 ||align=left| Jorge Arce
| || 1 (10)
| || align=left|
|align=left|
|-align=center
|Win || 35-3 ||align=left| German Meraz
| || 6 (8)
| || align=left|
|align=left|
|-align=center
|Win || 34-3 ||align=left| Alfredo Montano
| || 1 (8)
| || align=left|
|align=left|
|-align=center
|Loss || 33-3 ||align=left| Fernando Montiel
| || 4 (12)
| || align=left|
|align=left| 
|-align=center

See also 
Reigning boxing champions
List of Mexican boxing world champions

External links 
 
 Official website

1977 births
Boxers at the 1995 Pan American Games
Boxers at the 1996 Summer Olympics
Living people
Olympic boxers of Mexico
Boxers from Mexico City
Super-flyweight boxers
World Boxing Association champions
World super-flyweight boxing champions
Mexican male boxers
Pan American Games competitors for Mexico